Mount Innes-Taylor is a mountain,  high, standing  north of Mount Saltonstall at the south side of Poulter Glacier, in the Queen Maud Mountains of Antarctica. It was discovered in December 1934 by the Byrd Antarctic Expedition geological party under Quin Blackburn, and named by Richard E. Byrd for Captain Alan Innes-Taylor, who served with the expedition as chief of trail operations.

References

External links
 The Papers of Alan Innes-Taylor at Dartmouth College Library

Mountains of the Ross Dependency
Queen Maud Mountains
Amundsen Coast